The Forbidden Marriage is a South Korean television series starring Park Ju-hyun, Kim Young-dae, and Kim Woo-seok. It is based on screenwriter Chun Ji-hye's own web novel of the same title, which was also released as a webtoon. It aired from December 9, 2022 to January 21, 2023, on MBC TV's Fridays and Saturdays at 21:50 (KST) time slot.

Synopsis
Set in a fictional period within the Joseon dynasty, the series follows the story of King Lee Heon who has issued a marriage ban after the death of his crown princess seven years ago, and scammer So-rang who claims that she can be possessed by the late crown princess's spirit.

Cast

Main
 Park Ju-hyun as Ye So-rang
 Kim Young-dae as Lee Heon
 Kim Woo-seok as Lee Shin-won

Supporting
 Choi Deok-moon as Gwaeng-i
 Jung Bo-min as Hae-young
 Yang Dong-geun as Jo Seong-gyun
 Seo Jin-won as Kwon Rip
 Jeon Jin-oh as Na Sang-ju
 Lee Doo-seok as Kim Ui-jun
 Lee Hyun-geol as Se-jang
 Hwang Jung-min as a court lady
 Kim Min-sang as First Secretary Kim Seol-rok
 Jo Seung-yeon as Lee Jeong-hak
 Park Sun-young as Seo Un-jeong
 Song Ji-woo as Ye Hyun-hee
 Um Hyo-sup as Ye Hyun-ho
 Kim Min-ju as Crown Princess Ahn (Ahn Ja-yeon) / Cha-nyeon
 Cha Mi-kyung as Grand Royal Queen Dowager
 Yoon Jeong-hun as Ja Chun-seok
 Lee Jeong-hyun as Oh Deok-hoon
 Kim Min-seok as Wang-bae
 Hong Si-young as Jung Do-seok

Extended
 Lee Yoo-kyung as Soo-hyang
 Yoon Tae-in as Bae Yong-bae
 Lee Seung-min as Ji-hwal

Special appearances
 Park Gyeong-ree as Cho-ran
 Han Sang-jin as Ahn Ji-hyung
 No Min-woo as Ban Ran-tan
 Jo Soo-min as Hwa-yoon

Production
On November 10, 2022, an official from MBC announced that filming for the series was suspended after a staff member tested positive for COVID-19, and was scheduled to resume on November 14.

Original soundtrack

Part 1

Part 2

Part 3

Part 4

Viewership

Awards and nominations

Notes

References

External links
  
 
 

Korean-language television shows
MBC TV television dramas
Television shows based on South Korean novels
Television series by Bon Factory Worldwide
South Korean historical television series
South Korean romantic comedy television series
Television series set in the Joseon dynasty
2022 South Korean television series debuts
2023 South Korean television series endings
Television productions suspended due to the COVID-19 pandemic